The Parliament of Navarre (Spanish Parlamento de Navarra, Basque Nafarroako Parlamentua) or also known as Cortes de Navarra (in Spanish) or Nafarroako Gorteak (in Basque) is the Navarre autonomous unicameral parliament.

Functions
The Parliament's functions are regulated by the "Organic Law on the Reintegration and Improvement of the Autonomous Regime in Navarre" (Ley Orgánica de Reintegración y Amejoramiento del Régimen Foral de Navarra, also known as LORAFNA). These functions include representing the Navarre people, approving the laws and General Budget and electing and controlling the President, as in any other parliamentary system.

Structure and distribution
Currently, the Parliament is composed by 50 members. The chamber's size can be set by law between 40 and 70. Representatives are elected directly for four-year terms and all renewed simultaneously.

In the 2007 election, 22 seats were won by Navarrese People's Union, 12 by Navarre Yes, 12 by Socialist Party of Navarre, 2 by Democrats' Convergence of Navarre, and 2 by United Left (Spain).

In the 2011 election, 19 seats were won by Navarrese People's Union, 9 by Socialist Party of Navarre, 8 by Geroa Bai, 7 by Bildu, 4 by the People's Party and 3 by Izquierda-Ezkerra.

In the 2015 election, 15 seats were won by Navarrese People's Union, 9 by Geroa Bai, 8 by EH Bildu, 7 by Podemos/Ahal Dugu, 7 by Socialist Party of Navarre, 2 by the People's Party and 2 by Izquierda-Ezkerra.

In the 2019 election, 20 seats were won by Navarra Suma, 11 by Socialist Party of Navarre, 9 by Geroa Bai, 7 by EH Bildu, 2 by Podemos/Ahal Dugu and 1 by Izquierda-Ezkerra.

See also
List of presidents of the Parliament of Navarre

Notes

References

External links
 Official site (in English)
 "Organic Law on the Reintegration and Improvement of the Autonomous Regime in Navarre" (LORAFNA) (In Spanish)
   (In Spanish)

 
1982 establishments in Navarre
Navarre